XHRMO-FM is a noncommercial radio station on 88.1 FM in Hermosillo, Sonora. The station is owned by Democracia y Deliberación Desértica, A.C. and features a cultural format known as La Voz del Pitic.

History
XHRMO-FM was one of four stations awarded simultaneously by the IFT in Hermosillo on December 19, 2017, to resolve permit applications filed prior to 2014. Democracia y Deliberación Desértica, A.C., had filed for its station on August 5, 2013.
La Voz del Pitic began operations online in August 2018 and began broadcasting on 88.1 FM in January 2019.

References

Radio stations in Sonora
2019 establishments in Mexico
Radio stations established in 2019